Dorothy Haines Hoover (1904–1995), was a Canadian artist. She was born in Toronto, Ontario. Hoover earned a B.A. in Modern History at the University of Toronto in 1924 and began painting in the 1930s after learning from her father. She married G. L. J. Hoover in 1930. Hoover worked for the Royal Ontario Museum.  She is known for her landscape oil paintings and still life scenes.

References

Canadian women painters
Artists from Toronto
University of Toronto alumni
Canadian landscape painters
1904 births
1995 deaths
20th-century Canadian women artists
20th-century Canadian artists